= Steamboat City =

Ghost town in British Columbia, Canada

Steamboat City, is a ghost town located in British Columbia. The town is located near Shawatum Mountain also called Steamboat Mountain near Skagit River, British Columbia. To the west of the location lies Whitworth peak on the other side of Skagit River. Some national trails go through the area. Google maps indicates Steamboat has the postal Code V0C 2X0.
